The following is a list of magical objects used in the fictional universe of Harry Potter in the original book series, as well as in the adapted film series.

Communication

Fake Galleons
In Harry Potter and the Order of the Phoenix, Hermione Granger creates fake, enchanted Galleons (wizard money) that are used for communication between members of Dumbledore's Army (DA). Like non-enchanted Galleons, the coins have numerals around the edge. On non-enchanted Galleons these serial numbers signify the goblin who cast the coin; on the enchanted Galleons, the numbers represent the time and date of the next DA meeting. Due to the coins being infused with a Protean Charm, once Harry Potter alters his, every coin changes to suit. The coins grow hot when the numbers change to alert the members to look at their coins.

In Harry Potter and the Half-Blood Prince, Draco Malfoy uses a pair of enchanted coins to bypass the communication limits imposed on Hogwarts, thus managing to keep in contact with Madam Rosmerta, whom he had placed under the Imperius Curse. Draco reveals he got the idea from Hermione's DA coins, which were themselves inspired by Lord Voldemort's use of the Dark Mark to communicate with his Death Eaters.

In Harry Potter and the Deathly Hallows, Neville Longbottom uses the DA's coins to alert people such as Luna Lovegood and Ginny Weasley that Harry, Ron and Hermione have returned to Hogwarts.

Howler

A Howler is a scarlet-red letter sent to signify extreme anger or to convey a message very loudly and publicly. When it is opened, the sender's voice, which has been magically magnified to a deafening volume, bellows a message at the recipient and then self-destructs itself by burning. If it is not opened or there is a delay in opening it, the letter smoulders, explodes violently, and shouts the message out even louder than normal. In the film version, the Howler folds itself into an origami-style set of lips and teeth and shouts the message out, and then shreds itself into scraps of paper before it burns itself.

In Harry Potter and the Chamber of Secrets, Ron Weasley receives a Howler from his mother, Molly Weasley, after he steals his father's enchanted car and flies it to Hogwarts with Harry. Neville Longbottom confesses that he had once gotten a Howler from his grandmother Augusta, stating that he ignored it and that the result was horrible. Subsequently, Neville receives another Howler from his grandmother after Sirius Black uses his list of passwords to enter the Gryffindor common room in Harry Potter and the Prisoner of Azkaban. Hermione receives one in Harry Potter and the Goblet of Fire after Rita Skeeter publishes a false article about a relationship between Hermione and Harry. In Harry Potter and the Order of the Phoenix, Dumbledore sends Harry's aunt Petunia Dursley a Howler to remind her of the agreement to allow Harry to live at Privet Drive when Harry's Uncle Vernon attempts to throw him out.

Concealers

Deluminator

[[Image:Albdelumin.jpg|thumb|upright|Dumbledore is using his deluminator in the film Harry Potter and the Philosopher's Stone]]

A deluminator is a device invented by Albus Dumbledore that resembles a cigarette lighter. It is used to remove or absorb (as well as return) the light from any light source to provide cover to the user. In Harry Potter and the Philosopher's Stone, Dumbledore uses the deluminator (then referred to as the Put-Outer) to darken Privet Drive, where the Dursley family's house is located. It was seen in Order of the Phoenix where Dumbledore loans the deluminator to Alastor "Mad-Eye" Moody, who uses it when transporting Harry from the Dursleys' home to Sirius's home at Number 12, Grimmauld Place. In Half-Blood Prince, Dumbledore uses the deluminator again to darken Privet Drive before collecting Harry.

In Deathly Hallows, it is bequeathed to Ron by Dumbledore in his will. Later in the book, after Ron had left his friends in anger, the deluminator demonstrated an additional capability, similar to a homing device. Ron hears Hermione through the device as she says his name for the first time since he left, and, when he clicks it, the emitted ball of light enters his body and allows him to locate and apparate to the vicinity of Harry and Hermione's camp. J. K. Rowling stated Dumbledore left it to Ron because he believed he might have needed a little more guidance than Harry and Hermione.

Invisibility cloak
 
Within the Harry Potter universe, an invisibility cloak is used to make the wearer invisible. All are very rare and expensive. In Fantastic Beasts and Where to Find Them it is said invisibility cloaks may be spun from pelts of the Demiguise. Invisibility cloaks can also be ordinary cloaks with a Disillusionment Charm or a Bedazzlement Hex placed on them. Over time, these cloaks will lose their invisibility ability, eventually becoming opaque and vulnerable to penetration by various spells.

Moody is known to possess two invisibility cloaks. One of these was borrowed by Sturgis Podmore in the course of work for the Order of the Phoenix. Barty Crouch Sr. possessed one as well, which he used to hide his son Barty Crouch Jr. to prevent him from being found and returned to Azkaban, the wizarding prison. Several times in the series, characters have been shown to either suspect or in some other fashion "sense" that Harry is wearing his cloak: Snape is seen to be suspicious when being followed by Harry, even reaching out to grab at (what appears to be) thin air; in Half-Blood Prince, Draco Malfoy realises Harry is in his train carriage and successfully immobilizes him with a Petrificus Totalus (Body-Bind) curse, as despite wearing his cloak Harry inadvertently moved objects near him; and in Chamber of Secrets, Albus Dumbledore senses Harry and Ron beneath it in Hagrid's cabin while talking to Lucius Malfoy during the event when Cornelius Fudge comes to take Hagrid to Azkaban and Lucius Malfoy hands over to Dumbledore his suspension letter. Dumbledore was able to sense Harry and Ron beneath the invisibility cloak by discreetly performing a non-verbal Human-presence-revealing Spell.

 Deathly Hallows 

The Deathly Hallows are three magical objects that are the focus of Harry Potter and the Deathly Hallows – the Elder Wand, the Resurrection Stone, and the Cloak of Invisibility. When owned by one person, they are said to give mastery over death. The objects are generally remembered only as part of a wizard's fairy tale called The Tale of the Three Brothers, and have become mythological over time, but a small number of wizards including Dumbledore still believe in their existence and seek them. According to J. K. Rowling, the story about how these objects came into existence is based upon Geoffrey Chaucer's The Pardoner's Tale.

According to the tale, three brothers evaded Death, who gave them a choice of anything they wanted. The first brother chose a wand that could not be defeated in battle, the second brother asked for a way to bring back someone from the dead, and the third brother selected a cloak that made the wearer invisible, even to Death himself. Eventually, the first brother was killed, the second committed suicide, and finally, the third brother made Death a friend and gave the cloak to his son. The story is generally believed to refer to the Peverell brothers centuries ago, although very few actually believe the story to be fully true. Dumbledore believed that the Peverells were simply particularly powerful and ingenious wizard inventors. The sign of the Deathly Hallows had also been adopted as a personal symbol by dark wizard Gellert Grindelwald; therefore many wizards, such as Viktor Krum, mistakenly understood it to be a symbol of dark magic.

Dumbledore had sought the Hallows, initially in his youth as a friend of Grindelwald for the power they were said to bestow, but later on as a means to undo the accidental death of his sister. He eventually concluded he was "unworthy" to possess them. He feels Harry could be a more worthy custodian but also fears Harry would be enamoured of their power, therefore he guides Harry to them in a circuitous manner.

By contrast, Voldemort simply sought the wand for its supposedly unbeatable power, after his previous wand unaccountably failed to kill Harry Potter. He had not realised that the wand was one of three Hallows, nor sought the other two Hallows. He also possessed the Resurrection Stone but only made use of it as a Horcrux. Dumbledore says that he doubts Voldemort would have any interest in the Cloak or the Stone even if he did know about them.

Harry eventually comes to possess all three Hallows – the cloak being inherited from his father James Potter, later understood to be a descendant of one of the Peverell brothers, the Resurrection Stone in the Golden Snitch bequeathed to him by Dumbledore, and the allegiance and mastery of the Elder Wand when he defeats and disarms its prior owner, Draco Malfoy, who unwittingly won it from Dumbledore just before Dumbledore's death.

After Voldemort's death, Harry uses the Elder Wand to repair his own damaged wand, then decides to return it to Dumbledore's tomb, so that when Harry has a natural death, ownership of the Elder Wand will die with him. In the film, Harry realises that the Elder Wand is too dangerous to fall into the wrong hands again, so he snaps it in two and throws it off a bridge. He also drops the Resurrection Stone in the Forbidden Forest but decides not to look for it in the hope that no wizard or witch will ever be able to own all three Hallows. He keeps the Cloak he had inherited, with the thought that he might pass it on to his children someday.

 Elder Wand 

The Elder Wand, also known as, Deathstick or the Wand of Destiny, is an extremely powerful wand made of elder wood with a core of Thestral tail hair. In the book it is a thing of legend and is believed to have changed owners throughout history.

The wand's allegiance is thought to be won by killing its previous owner, and therefore its "bloody trail" had become "splattered across the pages of wizarding history", making it the Hallow most easily verified to be a real object. However, Harry discovers from Garrick Ollivander the wandmaker that this popular understanding is incorrect; the Elder Wand actually transfers its loyalty upon the defeat or disarmament, and not necessarily the killing, of its previous master. It will never work fully for a new owner otherwise. This subtle distinction becomes the basis upon which Voldemort is finally defeated, when he believes he has won the wand's allegiance by killing Snape, who killed Dumbledore, while Harry realises in fact he had disarmed the wand's true owner, Draco Malfoy, who had disarmed Dumbledore before Snape killed him. This left Harry and not Voldemort as the wand's true master in their final encounter, even though neither Draco nor Harry had physically possessed the Elder Wand at that point.

According to wizard folklore, the Elder Wand used by its true master cannot be defeated in a duel; this is incorrect, for Dumbledore was able to defeat the legendary dark wizard Gellert Grindelwald, who was the master of the Elder Wand at that point. It also appears, as the wand is somewhat sentient (as are all wands), that it will not allow itself to cause real harm to its true master. If its master dies naturally without ever being defeated or disarmed, the wand's exceptional power will end for any following owner, since it was never won from the former.

The power of the Elder Wand was first shown in history, as Antioch Peverell, the eldest of the mythical Three Brothers, had a duel with an enemy he had long wanted to defeat. He won, and left his enemy dead on the floor; however, after boasting of his unbeatable wand, Antioch was robbed and killed in his sleep by a rival wanting to take the wand. It eventually came to the possession of Mykew Gregorovitch, a Bulgarian wandmaker. Gregorovitch boasted about possessing the Elder Wand, believing it would boost his popularity, and he tried to reverse engineer its secrets as he faced competition from Ollivander. It was stolen from him by Grindelwald, a former friend of Dumbledore who sought to impose wizard power in the world. Grindelwald was defeated "at the height of his power" by Dumbledore, who in his later years considered it the "only hallow [he] was fit to possess, not to boast of it or kill with it, but to tame it".

Dumbledore arranged his own death with Severus Snape, intending in part for Snape to "end up with the Elder Wand." Because his death would have been pre-arranged and not the result of his defeat, he had hoped this might break the wand's power. However, Draco Malfoy disarmed Dumbledore before his death at the hands of Snape, causing the plan to fail; the wand was buried in Dumbledore's tomb, but Draco had already unwittingly become its new master, even though he never took physical possession of it from Dumbledore. After Harry disarms Draco (even though Draco is not using the Elder Wand), the wand becomes loyal to Harry instead.

In the final book, Voldemort seeks the wand in order to defeat Harry – his previous wands having failed – and breaks into Dumbledore's tomb to claim the wand as his own. During the Battle of Hogwarts, he understands that the wand is not performing for him as legend says it should, and mistakenly concludes this is because it had become loyal to Snape when Snape killed Dumbledore, and would only become loyal to him upon his killing of Snape. He therefore kills Snape, and believes the wand will thereafter serve him and be unbeatable, but during his final duel with Harry his Killing Curse rebounds and he dies – as Harry had warned him – since the Elder Wand will not allow itself to be used by him against its true master.

After Voldemort's death, Harry uses the Elder Wand to repair his own broken holly and phoenix-feather wand, which he says he was "happier with." He decides to return the Elder Wand to Dumbledore's grave, feeling that if he dies peacefully, its superior power will end. In the film, Harry snaps the wand in two and throws the pieces off a bridge.

Ron stated that the Elder Wand would be the Hallow he would choose, simply because it is the "unbeatable wand", arguing that it was only dangerous to the brother who requested it because he kept on talking about his ownership of it and encouraging people to fight him. Hermione (who said she would choose the Cloak) is sceptical, reminding him that the Wand, by its very nature, would make its possessor overconfident and braggadocious. J. K. Rowling revealed in an interview that the first working title for Harry Potter and the Deathly Hallows was Harry Potter and the Elder Wand.

 Resurrection Stone 
The Resurrection Stone allows the holder to bring back deceased loved ones, in a semi-physical form, and communicate with them. The form of Sirius Black generated by the stone tells Harry that he and the other forms created by the stone are part of him and invisible to others. This seems to suggest that these apparitions are conjured from memories and are not really resurrected people. According to the fairy tale concerning the origin of the Deathly Hallows, using the Resurrection Stone drove the owner to kill himself because he brought his late fiancée back from the dead, and she was very unhappy in the real world because she did not belong there. By the time the stone was seen in Marvolo Gaunt's possession, it had been set into a ring that bore the symbol of the Deathly Hallows, which the ignorant Gaunt believed to be the Peverell coat of arms; he used the ring to boast about his ancestry and blood purity. Both Dumbledore and Grindelwald desired the stone, but for different reasons. While Dumbledore wanted it to communicate with his dead family, Grindelwald allegedly intended to use it to create an army of zombie-like Inferi. Harry said this is the Hallow he would desire most, as like Dumbledore he could name people he would like to communicate with again. Voldemort became aware of the ring's antiquity and eventually used it as a Horcrux, a container for part of his soul, being unaware of the stone's additional magical properties.

Dumbledore recovered the ring from Marvolo's estate, recognizing it as both a Horcrux and one of the Deathly Hallows. Forgetting that as a Horcrux, it was likely to be protected by curses laid by Voldemort, and blinded by personal desire, Dumbledore attempted to use the Resurrection Stone to talk to his deceased family. The curse destroyed his hand and began to spread throughout his body. Though the spread was partly contained in the destroyed and blackened hand by Snape, Dumbledore was doomed, having, at most, a year left to live. In their Kings Cross encounter, Dumbledore told Harry that this proved he had learned nothing from his past mistakes and ambitions for using the Hallows, and was part of the reason for his fear that Harry might also become obsessed with their power if told of them.

The stone was later passed to Harry through Dumbledore's will, hidden inside the Golden Snitch Harry caught with his mouth, nearly swallowing it, in his first-ever Quidditch match. The Snitch revealed the message "I open at the close" when touched by Harry's lips. Harry is unable to open the Snitch until he is about to die in the Forest, and realises then "the close" means the end, or his death. Harry uses the Stone to summon his deceased loved ones – his parents, his godfather Sirius Black, and Remus Lupin – to comfort him and strengthen his courage, before he goes to meet his death at Voldemort's hand. The stone falls unseen from Harry's numb fingers in the Forbidden Forest as he reaches Voldemort's encampment. Harry survives the encounter and he and Dumbledore's portrait later agreed that Harry will neither search for it nor tell others where it is. In a 2007 interview, J. K. Rowling said she would like to believe a centaur's hoof pushed it into the ground, burying it forever.

 Cloak of Invisibility 

Introduced in Harry Potter and the Philosopher's Stone, the cloak of Invisibility has the power to shield the wearer from being seen by Death. Unlike other invisibility cloaks known to exist, it is able to completely shield the wearer and others from sight and cannot be worn out by time or spells; other cloaks will lose their ability to conceal the wearer over time or become worn out, but the Hallow cloak will never fade or become damaged. At the end of Deathly Hallows, Dumbledore explains to Harry the cloak's true magic is it can shield and protect others as well as its owner. This is apparent when it does not respond to a Death Eater's Summoning Charm while concealing Harry, Ron and Hermione in Deathly Hallows. Hermione claims that this is the Hallow she would choose, citing the usefulness Harry has found of it.

It was the Hallow belonging to Ignotus Peverell, who did not trust Death and took the cloak to hide from him, only giving it up when he was old and ready for death. After his death, the cloak was passed down from father to son through Peverell's descendants, through his granddaughter, Iolanthe Peverell of Godric's Hollow, who married Hardwin Potter of the Gloucestershire Potters, all the way directly down to James Potter. 

The cloak was not in James' possession the night he was murdered; he had previously lent it to Dumbledore, who was greatly interested in the Deathly Hallows and suspected that the Potter family heirloom was more than it appeared. Dumbledore returned the cloak to Harry a decade later as a Christmas present during his first year at Hogwarts. Harry uses the cloak throughout the series in order to sneak around the school on various adventures. Harry's father also used the cloak for similar purposes. It is large enough to accommodate Harry, Ron, and Hermione as a group during their first year, but the three have increasing difficulty fitting under it as they grow taller in later years.

While making the wearer invisible to Muggles and wizards, some creatures are able to sense people hidden under it. Snakes, for example, cannot see through the Cloak of Invisibility, but they can somehow detect people under it. Mrs. Norris, Filch's cat, also seems to sense Harry when he wears the cloak. Wearers can also be detected by the Human-presence-revealing Spell. In Goblet of Fire, Moody's magical eye can see Harry under the cloak. In Prisoner of Azkaban, Dumbledore warns that the Dementors' perception of humans is unhindered by invisibility cloaks, as they are blind and sense people through emotions.

In the play Harry Potter and the Cursed Child, Harry gives the Cloak of Invisibility to his eldest son James Potter, noting he'd "been going on about the Invisibility Cloak since time itself". However, James' younger brother Albus steals the Cloak and uses it to evade bullies at Hogwarts.

Detectors

 Alastor Moody's Eyeball 
Alastor Moody lost his eye sometime during the First Wizarding War. He replaced it with an enchanted glass eyeball. In the film Harry Potter and the Goblet of Fire, the eyeball is blue, and replaces his left eye. In the books, it replaces his right eye.

The eyeball has many magical enchantments on it, giving it the ability to see through walls and other solid objects, notably invisibility cloaks, can rotate 360 degrees inside his head, and can be fully removed from his head. The eyeball is also very sensitive, as after Barty Crouch Jr. was caught Moody complained that the eyeball kept sticking "ever since that scum wore it".

After Moody was killed on 27 July 1997 during the plan to move Harry from 4 Privet Drive, the eyeball was given to Dolores Umbridge after his body was recovered by Death Eaters. She placed the eyeball in her door so that she could keep an eye on her employees. Harry stole the eyeball during his raid on the ministry, and buried it in the forest, where the Quidditch World Cup was held.

Foe-glass
A Foe-glass is a mirror that detects and shows its owner's enemies in or out of focus, depending on how close they are. Barty Crouch Jr., while impersonating Moody, says that when the whites of their eyes are visible, he is in trouble. When Crouch Jr. is attacking Harry after the third task, Harry sees Snape, McGonagall and Dumbledore approach the room in the mirror before they show up. A Foe-glass is hanging in the Room of Requirement in Harry Potter and the Order of the Phoenix when Harry uses the Room for D.A. meetings. Like all dark detectors, it can be fooled, as mentioned by Harry at the beginning of the first D.A. meeting.

The Marauder's Map

The Marauder's Map is a magical map of Hogwarts created by Remus Lupin, Peter Pettigrew, Sirius Black, and James Potter (respectively nicknamed "Moony", "Wormtail", "Padfoot", and "Prongs") while they were students at Hogwarts. 

In Harry Potter and the Prisoner of Azkaban, Fred and George Weasley give the map to Harry so he can travel to Hogsmeade through a hidden passageway. The twins had previously stolen the map from a drawer in Filch's office that contained dangerous confiscated objects; it is revealed by Lupin that Filch probably knew what it was but not how to work it. Snape later finds the map in Harry's possession and tries to force it to reveal its secrets, but the map insults him. Lupin, the Defence Against the Dark Arts teacher at the time, is called upon to investigate this "dark object", and confiscates it to keep Harry safe. Later he returns it to Harry after resigning his post at Hogwarts. From then on, the map becomes one of Harry's most useful tools in his ongoing adventures.

When not in use, the Map is simply a blank piece of parchment. It can be activated by pointing a wand at it and saying, "I solemnly swear that I am up to no good", at which point the message "Messrs. Moony, Wormtail, Padfoot and Prongs, purveyors of aids to magical mischief-makers, are proud to present the Marauder's Map" appears, along with a detailed layout of Hogwarts. The map is restored to its original blank state by saying "Mischief managed". The map displays the location of everyone within the castle and its grounds. It includes locations of secret passageways and instructions on how to access them. Several locations like the Room of Requirement and the Chamber of Secrets do not appear on the map, either as the Marauders did not have any knowledge of them, or, in the case of the former, they are not a fixed location. Animagus disguises, Polyjuice Potion, and invisibility cloaks cannot fool the map. In Prisoner of Azkaban, Peter Pettigrew, who is supposed to be dead but as an Animagus has transformed into a rat, shows up on the map under his real name. In Goblet of Fire, Barty Crouch Jr. is using Polyjuice Potion to disguise himself as Moody. At one point, Harry catches him on the map searching Snape's office for ingredients, but mistakes him for his father, Barty Crouch Sr., as the map cannot differentiate between two individuals who share a first and last name. Crouch Jr. subsequently confiscates the map from Harry, and uses it to track down and murder his own father when his father breaks free of the Imperius Curse and comes to Hogwarts looking for him. 

On the prop version of the map made for the films, the lines are made up of what at first glance are just random letters, but upon closer inspection are Latin words. The series makes no mention of Harry recovering the map from Crouch Jr.'s office, even though he continued to use it in later books; when asked about this discrepancy, J. K. Rowling answered that Harry had indeed sneaked into the office and recovered it in the days following the Third Task, and that she had forgotten to include this detail in the book. When asked during an online question session, "What child did Harry give the Marauder's Map to, if any?" (after his school years), J. K. Rowling responded, "I've got a feeling he didn't give it to any of them, but that James (Harry's eldest son) sneaked it out of his father's desk one day." However, in Cursed Child, Harry is shown to still possess the Marauder's Map and gives it to Professor McGonagall to keep an eye on his wayward son Albus Potter.

Probity Probe
A Probity Probe detects spells of concealment and hidden magical objects. The detector made its first appearance in Order of the Phoenix at the Ministry of Magic as a thin golden rod. After Voldemort's return, Probes are used as part of the increased security at Gringotts Bank as well as for scanning the students of Hogwarts for Dark objects. They are last seen when Harry, Ron, and Hermione arrive at Gringotts in Deathly Hallows to rob Bellatrix Lestrange's vault of one of Voldemort's Horcruxes.

Remembrall

A Remembrall is a small, clear orb, about the size of a large marble, containing smoke that turns red when it detects that the person holding it has forgotten something. It does not tell the holder what has been forgotten. The forgetful Neville Longbottom is sent a Remembrall by his grandmother in Philosopher's Stone. Remembralls are forbidden from being used during the O.W.L. exams.

Revealer
A Revealer is a bright red eraser, used to make invisible ink appear. It made its first appearance in Chamber of Secrets when Hermione tried to make hidden writing appear in Tom Riddle's diary.

Secrecy Sensor
The Secrecy Sensor is a dark detector described as "an object that looked something like an extra-squiggly, golden television aerial." It vibrates when it detects concealment and lies. In Harry Potter and the Goblet of Fire, Barty Crouch Jr disguised as Alastor Moody mentions that it is "no use here, of course, too much interference – students in every direction lying about why they haven’t done their homework."

In Order of the Phoenix, Secrecy Sensors are used at the Atrium Desk in the Ministry of Magic upon visitors to the government locale. Later in the book, Harry mentions to Dumbledore's Army that they can be easily fooled like their other dark-detecting counterparts. In Half-Blood Prince, due to Hogwarts' new stringent security measures, Argus Filch is assigned to inspect every student entering the castle with Secrecy Sensors. All the owls flying into Hogwarts are also placed under this measure to ensure that no Dark object enters the castle through mail. Hermione later explains that although Secrecy Sensors detect jinxes, curses, and Concealment Charms, they cannot detect love potions, as they are not considered Dark.

Sneakoscope
A Sneakoscope serves as a Dark Arts detector. The device is described as a miniature glass spinning-top that emits shrill noises in the presence of deception, for instance, when an untrustworthy person is near or when a deceitful event takes place nearby.

Sneakoscopes are introduced in Prisoner of Azkaban when Harry receives a pocket-sized version from Ron for his 13th birthday. Bill says that Pocket Sneakoscopes are unreliable, as it lit up and spun at dinner for apparently no reason, but Fred and George had put beetles in his soup without his knowledge. The sneakoscope appears again on the Hogwarts Express, and again in Harry and Ron's dormitory. Harry later discovers that Scabbers, Ron's rat, who is present each time the Sneakoscope is spinning, is actually Peter Pettigrew in Animagus form. In Goblet of Fire, Alastor Moody has several sneakoscopes that he somehow disabled, claiming, "It wouldn't stop whistling", keeping them in one of the seven compartments of his magical trunk. The sneakoscopes' constant alerts in his presence were because he was Barty Crouch Jr. using Polyjuice Potion. In Deathly Hallows, Hermione gives Harry a Sneakoscope for his seventeenth birthday which they later use as a lookout while in hiding.

Weasley family clock

The Weasleys have a special clock in their home, the Burrow, with nine hands, one for every member of the family. Instead of telling the time, the clock reveals the location or status of each family member. The known locations are: Home, School, Work, Travelling, Lost, Hospital, Prison, and Mortal Peril. The Weasleys are the only family mentioned in the series to own such a clock. Dumbledore calls the clock "excellent" and seems impressed by it.

The location Mortal Peril is situated where the numeral 12 would normally be. Throughout the first five books, the hands change to reflect the varying statuses of the family members, but by the sixth book all nine hands point to mortal peril at all times, except when someone is travelling. Mrs. Weasley takes this to mean that with Voldemort's return, everyone is always in mortal peril, but she cannot verify this as she does not know anyone else who has a clock like hers.

Various fans have re-created the clock for their own families, for example by using geofencing for cell phones.Weasley Clock in 9 Steps

Games
Exploding Snap
Exploding Snap is a wizarding card game in which the cards spontaneously explode during games. The game is popular with Hogwarts students. In Chamber of Secrets, Harry and Ron are held back from investigating why spiders were fleeing Hogwarts because Fred and George delayed them with this game. Ron later singed his eyebrows while building a card house with Exploding Snap cards. In Order of the Phoenix, Lee Jordan is punished by Dolores Umbridge for saying that she cannot tell them off for playing this game, as one of her Educational Decrees states that teachers can only talk to students about the subjects they are paid to teach. In Cursed Child, Ginny remembers playing this game with Harry following the events of Chamber of Secrets and notes that it helped her to recover from the trauma (all the other students avoided her after learning the truth).

Gobstones
Gobstones is one of the many magical games played by young wizards in the books, along with Wizard's Chess and Exploding Snap. Gobstones is similar to the games of marbles and pétanque, except that in Gobstones, the balls spit, or gob, a foul-smelling liquid in the face of the opposing player when they lose a point. Hogwarts students are seen playing Gobstones throughout the books, and there is even a Gobstones Club at the school. It is also noted in the Harry Potter series that Eileen Prince (Snape's mother) was captain of Hogwarts' Gobstone Club, as a student, at age 15.

Quidditch balls
The Quidditch balls consist of a Quaffle, a large red ball (and the only one not bewitched to fly on its own) which the Chasers need to get through the three hoops on the field, gaining ten points each time this successfully occurs; two Bludgers, which fly around attempting to disturb the game and knock people off their brooms, and which the Beaters hit away from teammates and towards the opposing team; and the Golden Snitch, a very fast and difficult-to-see golden orb the size of a walnut with wings, which the Seeker on each team must capture to finish the game and gain 150 points. The Quidditch players wear gloves, leg pads, padded head guards, and occasionally goggles.

Self-Shuffling Playing Cards
In Chamber of Secrets, a pack of Self-Shuffling Cards is mentioned as one of the various objects littering the floor of Ron's room in the Burrow.

Wizard's Chess
Wizard's Chess is played with pieces and a board identical to Chess. The rules are also unchanged. The pieces are magically animated, and they violently attack each other when performing a capture, by knocking the captured piece out and dragging it off the board. The players order the pieces to move using algebraic chess notation.

Ron has a wizard's chess set left to him by his grandfather, and Harry first plays with pieces borrowed from Seamus Finnigan, which kept shouting him advice because they did not trust him. Harry later gets a set of his own during his first Christmas at Hogwarts.

During the 16th chapter of Philosopher's Stone, Harry, Ron and Hermione become human chess pieces in a life-sized game of Wizard's Chess, which Harry wins thanks to Ron's advice and sacrifice as a piece. In the films, the chess pieces are depicted using replicas of Lewis Chessmen.

Horcruxes
A Horcrux is an object used to store part of a person's soul, protecting that person from death (a function similar to a phylactery from other fantasy works). If the body of a Horcrux owner is killed, that portion of the soul that had remained in the body does not pass on to the next world, but will rather exist in a non-corporeal form capable of being resurrected by another wizard, as stated in Harry Potter and the Half-Blood Prince and demonstrated in Harry Potter and the Goblet of Fire. If all of someone's Horcruxes are destroyed, then the soul's only anchor in the material world would be the body, the destruction of which would then cause final death. The creation of Horcruxes is considered the darkest of all magic.

This method was chosen by Voldemort to attain immortality. The concept is introduced in Harry Potter and the Half-Blood Prince. J. K. Rowling uses Horace Slughorn's expository dialogue to reveal that the creation of a Horcrux requires one to commit a murder, which, as the supreme act of evil, "rips the soul apart". After the murder, a spell is cast to infuse part of the ripped soul into an object, which then becomes a Horcrux. In the final book of the series, Hermione finds the spell in a book titled Secrets of the Darkest Art. Rowling has revealed that she intends to detail the process and spell used to create a Horcrux in her long-mentioned Harry Potter Encyclopedia.

Both inanimate objects and living organisms have been used as Horcruxes, though the latter are considered riskier to use, since a living being can move and think for itself. There is no limit to the number of Horcruxes a witch or wizard can create. As the creator's soul is divided into progressively smaller portions, they lose more of their natural humanity and the soul becomes increasingly unstable. Consequently, under very specific conditions, a soul fragment can be sealed within an object without the intention or knowledge of the creator. While the object thus affected will, like any Horcrux, preserve the immortality of the creator, it does not become a "Dark object". For example, Voldemort has unusual control over Nagini, and consequently Nagini is able to communicate with Voldemort about the presence of Harry in Godric's Hollow in Harry Potter and the Deathly Hallows.

Horcruxes made from inanimate objects are extremely difficult to destroy. They cannot be destroyed by conventional means such as smashing, breaking, or burning. To be destroyed, a Horcrux must suffer damage so severe that repair through magical means would be impossible. Very few magical objects or spells are powerful enough to achieve this (mentioned and used were the Fiendfyre, Gryffindor's Sword and Basilisk fangs, the last two only being able to inflict such damage due to the basilisk venom permeating them both). Once a Horcrux is irreparably damaged, the fragment of soul within it is destroyed. A Horcrux can be deliberately undone magically only if the creator goes through a process of deep remorse for the murder committed to create the Horcrux. The pain of this remorse can be so excruciating that the process may kill the creator. The known materials or objects known to be able to destroy Horcruxes are as follows:
 Basilisk Venom. When Harry killed the Basilisk in Harry Potter and the Chamber of Secrets, his arm was stabbed by a basilisk fang, and, shortly later, Tom Riddle states, "Remarkable, isn't it? How quickly the venom of the Basilisk penetrates the body." He also states that Harry would die within the minute. Basilisk fangs are permanently impregnated with venom, making them very effective at destroying Horcruxes.
 The Sword of Gryffindor. The Sword cannot be damaged in any way, shape, or form, as it is goblin-made. It can only change in such a way that makes it stronger than it previously was. When it was used to kill a Basilisk, the blade absorbed the venom, making the blade fatal by a single cut, and making it capable of destroying Horcruxes, due to the presence of the venom on the blade.
 Fiendfyre. A magical flame that cannot be extinguished unless it runs out of fuel. It burns incredibly hot, and almost nothing can resist its power. It can be summoned by a simple spell, but is very difficult to control. Its damage is irreparable, making it possible to destroy Horcruxes, but would likely kill the user in the process, as this happened to Crabbe when he summoned the flame trying to kill Harry, Ron, and Hermione in the Room of Requirement.

Voldemort's creation of Horcruxes is central to the later storyline of the Harry Potter novels. As the number seven is a powerful number in magic, Voldemort intended to split his soul into that many pieces, with six Horcruxes and the last piece reposing within his body. When Voldemort attacked the Potter family, and his body was destroyed by the rebounded Killing Curse, a piece of his soul splintered off and attached itself to the only living thing remaining in the room, Harry Potter, in a manner similar to a Horcrux. Later on, Voldemort went on to complete his collection of the intended six Horcruxes by turning his snake Nagini into one, thus fragmenting his soul into a total of eight (counting the one residing in his own body), not seven, pieces. By that time, though, unbeknownst to Voldemort himself, the first Horcrux (a diary) had already been destroyed and, therefore, the seven Horcruxes never all existed together at the same point in time.

All of Voldemort's deliberately created Horcruxes were made using objects that had been important to him or that held some symbolic value. He hid some of them carefully so that no one could find and destroy them, but used Nagini to do his bidding on several occasions, and the diary was always intended to be a weapon to carry out Voldemort's plan to remove Muggle-borns from Hogwarts. Even without magical protection, Horcruxes cannot be destroyed by any means of wand usage or physical force.  In Harry Potter and the Chamber of Secrets, Harry intentionally destroys the diary with a Basilisk fang, although unaware it was a Horcrux at the time, to free Ginny from its influence. In Harry Potter and the Half-Blood Prince, the discovery of the diary is revealed as the proof that leads to Dumbledore beginning the hunt for other Horcruxes, as it not only gives absolute proof that Voldemort split his soul, but also that there were likely other, better-protected artifacts, given the risk Voldemort was taking by using the diary as a weapon.

J. K. Rowling revealed on Pottermore that Quirinus Quirrell served as a temporary Horcrux when Voldemort's soul possessed his body during Harry's first year at Hogwarts. A notable difference, however, is that the piece of soul within Quirrell was able to exist without its container, as it abandoned Quirrell and left him to die in the underground chambers.

Tom Riddle's diary

Tom Riddle created his first Horcrux during his fifth year at Hogwarts, using his own school diary. He cast the spell after murdering his fellow student Myrtle Warren using the Basilisk. The diary is introduced in the thirteenth chapter of Chamber of Secrets and is destroyed by Harry Potter during the climax of the same book.

Before Voldemort's downfall, he entrusted the Horcrux to Lucius Malfoy. While aware of its corrupting magical properties, Malfoy did not know the diary was a Horcrux from Voldemort, Voldemort having informed him of its value as a weapon but believing that he would be in a position to coordinate Malfoy's use of it. In an attempt to discredit Arthur Weasley as well as dispose of an incriminating Dark object, Malfoy hid the diary in Ginny Weasley's cauldron amongst her other books. Tom Riddle's soul-fragment possessed Ginny and, through her, reopened the Chamber of Secrets, eventually starting to draw her life from her. At the end of book two, Harry saved Ginny and destroyed the diary by stabbing it with the venomous fang of a Basilisk, making it the first Horcrux to be destroyed. His reports of the diary's behaviour to Dumbledore were the latter's first inkling that Voldemort might have created not just one Horcrux, but several: "What intrigued and alarmed me most was that the diary had been intended as a weapon as much as a safeguard", implying that Voldemort must have had backups of some sort. It is mentioned that Lucius was meant to wait for Voldemort's authorization before allowing the diary to be smuggled into Hogwarts, and that he never received it before Voldemort's first defeat. Voldemort did not learn of the diary's destruction until he forced the truth out of Lucius.

To J. K. Rowling, a diary is a very scary object, having said in an interview: "The temptation particularly for a young girl, is to pour out her heart to a diary." Rowling's little sister Diane was prone to this, and her great fear was that someone would read her diary. This gave Rowling the idea to have a diary that is, in itself, against the confider. When asked what would have happened if Ginny had died and Riddle had managed to escape, Rowling revealed that "it would have strengthened the present-day Voldemort considerably."

Marvolo Gaunt's ring

Tom Riddle created his second Horcrux using a ring owned by his maternal grandfather, Marvolo Gaunt, during the summer before his sixth year as a student at Hogwarts, when he was sixteen years old. The murder that created the Horcrux was that of his father. The ring is introduced during the fourth chapter of Half-Blood Prince, having already been destroyed by Albus Dumbledore.

In a Pensieve memory, it is revealed that Riddle had taken the gold ring, which has a black stone inscribed with a magical symbol, from his uncle Morfin Gaunt, whom he had framed for the murder of his Muggle father and grandparents by altering his uncle's memories. Riddle wears the ring while still a student at Hogwarts, but eventually hides it in the house where the Gaunt family had lived. It remains hidden under the floorboards, placed in a golden box and protected by several enchantments, until Dumbledore finds it during the summer break between the events of Order of the Phoenix and Half-Blood Prince. Dumbledore destroys the second Horcrux with Godric Gryffindor's sword, but, as revealed in Harry Potter and the Deathly Hallows, he also recognizes the stone in the ring as the Resurrection Stone, one of the three Deathly Hallows. The Resurrection Stone was the Hallow Dumbledore most desired, hoping to assuage his guilt for his part in the death of his sister, Ariana. Though afterwards he recognized it as totally unwise, Dumbledore, forgetting it was also a Horcrux and thus likely to be protected by destructive enchantments, hoping to activate it and apologise to his long-dead family, places the ring on his hand. He is mortally injured by the ring's curses. The injury leaves his right hand permanently disfigured and would have killed him quickly if not for the intervention of Snape who slowed the curse to Dumbledore's withered right hand and arm. But Snape's efforts could not stop the curses from eventually killing him, and Dumbledore's planned death by Snape deceives Voldemort and his followers. The damaged ring is kept for a time on a table in the Headmaster's office.

 Salazar Slytherin's locket 

Tom Riddle created his fourth Horcrux using his own ancestor Salazar Slytherin's locket, which had once belonged to Riddle's mother, Merope Gaunt. The spell was cast after Riddle murdered a Muggle tramp. The locket is introduced briefly in the sixth chapter of Order of the Phoenix, described only as "a heavy locket that not one of them could open" It is destroyed by Ron Weasley in the nineteenth chapter of Deathly Hallows.

Slytherin's locket was passed down through the generations and eventually ended up in the possession of Merope Gaunt. After being abandoned by her Muggle husband Tom Riddle Sr., Merope sold the locket to Caractacus Burke, shopkeeper of Borgin & Burkes, for 10 Galleons, a small fraction of the locket's true value. The locket was eventually sold to Hepzibah Smith. Riddle stole the locket, along with Helga Hufflepuff's cup, after murdering Hepzibah Smith. Once the locket became a Horcrux, Voldemort hid it in a magically protected seaside cave. Dumbledore and Harry Potter pursued the locket in The Half-Blood Prince only to find a fake one at the bottom of the basin.

Disillusioned Death Eater Regulus Black had learned about the Horcrux and its hiding place from his house elf Kreacher, whom he had originally volunteered to accompany Voldemort to hide the Horcrux. In an effort to bring about Voldemort's eventual downfall, he and Kreacher navigated the magical protection and stole the locket, replacing it with the false one to fool Voldemort. While Black died in the effort, killed by the surrounding Inferi, Kreacher took the locket back to their home at Number 12, Grimmauld Place. Unable to destroy it as Regulus had ordered, Kreacher continued to protect the locket for years. While the Order of the Phoenix was using the house as its headquarters, the locket was stolen by Mundungus Fletcher, a petty criminal and member of the Order. He gave it to Dolores Umbridge as a bribe when she caught him selling stolen property.

Two weeks after learning these details, Harry, Ron, and Hermione infiltrated the Ministry of Magic, where Umbridge worked, and stole the locket. Ron later saved Harry from being strangled by it when he wore it around his neck while attempting to retrieve the sword of Godric Gryffindor from the bottom of a lake in the Forest of Dean. When Ron attempted to destroy the locket, the fragment of soul inside assumed the shape of Harry and Hermione and played on Ron's fear that his two friends had started a romantic relationship during his absence. Briefly at this point, Ron's eyes gleamed scarlet, like Voldemort's. Ron destroyed the locket using the sword of Gryffindor in the same forest.

 Helga Hufflepuff's cup 
Tom Riddle created his third Horcrux using Helga Hufflepuff's cup. The cup is introduced during the twentieth chapter of Half-Blood Prince and is destroyed by Hermione Granger in the thirty-first chapter of Deathly Hallows.

Hepzibah Smith, who owned the cup, was a distant descendant of Helga Hufflepuff. Riddle killed Smith by poisoning her, stole the cup, and then framed her house elf Hokey for the crime. Voldemort entrusted the cup to Bellatrix Lestrange, who kept it protected in her vault at Gringotts Bank, a place to which Harry guessed a once penniless Voldemort would have always coveted a connection. Additional protective spells, including Geminio (multiply curse) and Flagrante (fire curse), were used to protect the contents of the vault. Harry, Ron and Hermione, with Hermione disguised as Bellatrix, broke into the bank and stole the cup. Hermione later destroyed the Horcrux using a fang from the remains of the Basilisk still in the Chamber of Secrets during the Battle of Hogwarts.

Rowena Ravenclaw's diadem

Tom Riddle created his fifth Horcrux using Rowena Ravenclaw's diadem. The diadem is introduced briefly in the twenty-fourth chapter of Half-Blood Prince, it was described as "a tarnished tiara" in the Room of Requirement, but was later introduced by name and destroyed with Fiendfyre cast by Vincent Crabbe in the thirty-first chapter of Deathly Hallows.

Ravenclaw's daughter, Helena, stole the diadem from her mother in an attempt to become more intelligent than her mother. She fled to Albania, where she hid the diadem in the hollow of a tree when the Bloody Baron searched for her. After Helena was murdered by the Bloody Baron, she became the Ravenclaw house ghost. Tom Riddle, while a student at the school, endeared her ghost so that she would tell him the location of the diadem. Shortly after leaving Hogwarts and after the murder of Hepzibah Smith, he travelled to Albania and retrieved the artifact. Voldemort murdered an Albanian peasant to turn the diadem into a Horcrux. Years later Voldemort hid the diadem in the Room of Requirement when he returned to Hogwarts to reapply for the Defence Against the Dark Arts position; he was denied the job by Albus Dumbledore. Because Voldemort believed himself to be the only one to have discovered the Room, he never placed any curses around the diadem.

In Harry Potter and the Half-Blood Prince, Harry first comes into contact with the diadem when he hastily hides Snape's old potions book in the Room of Requirement. The diadem was mentioned merely as an "old discoloured tiara" in the sixth book; Harry used it to help mark the spot so he could later find where he placed the book. Later, after having the diadem described to him by the Ravenclaw ghost, Harry recalls this scene and hurries to retrieve it from the Room. The diadem was unintentionally destroyed by a Fiendfyre curse cast by Vincent Crabbe as he, Gregory Goyle, and Draco Malfoy attacked Harry, Ron, and Hermione inside the Room. In the film version, Harry stabs the diadem with another basilisk fang and Ron kicks it into the Room of Requirement, as the Fiendfyre reaches the door.

 Harry Potter 

When Voldemort attempted to murder Harry, he inadvertently sealed a fragment of his soul within him in a manner similar to a Horcrux. The event took place just before the opening chapter of Philosopher's Stone. Rowling has explicitly stated that Harry never became a proper "Dark object" since the Horcrux spell was not cast. Regardless, as with all Horcruxes, Voldemort would remain immortal so long as his soul fragment remained within Harry. That portion of Voldemort's soul is unintentionally destroyed by Voldemort himself at the close of the thirty-fourth chapter of Deathly Hallows with the help of the Elder Wand.

As a baby, Harry was in the room when Voldemort's fatal Killing Curse backfired. Voldemort's soul had been weakened and destabilised by his continuous murders and the creation of his previous Horcruxes. Harry became a Horcrux when a fragment of Voldemort's soul attached itself to him after the unsuccessful curse. The lightning bolt-shaped scar on Harry's forehead is a direct result of this attempted murder, and the connection that formed as a result is used to explain several important plot points. Throughout the series, Harry is able to receive insight into Voldemort's mental and emotional states, allowing the reader to eavesdrop on the series' primary antagonist. This insight is usually accompanied by pain in the scar on Harry's forehead. Through Voldemort, Harry also inherited the ability to speak and understand Parseltongue. It is also revealed by Rowling in an interview that Harry's frequent pain in his scar when Voldemort is either active, nearby, or feeling strong emotions, is really the trapped bit of soul yearning to depart from Harry's body and rejoin its master's soul.

This yearning was one of the reasons why the Killing Curse used by Voldemort on Harry in the Forbidden Forest does destroy the fragment of Voldemort's soul within Harry, but only sends Harry's soul into a near-death state. Harry could return to his body despite being hit by the Killing Curse from the Elder Wand because Voldemort had used Harry's blood to regain his full strength in Harry Potter and the Goblet of Fire, and because the actual master of the Elder Wand, Draco Malfoy, had been defeated by Harry, making Harry the new master of the Elder Wand. Harry's ownership of the wand used for the curse and the Horcrux-like connection between Voldemort and Harry diminished Voldemort's curse and protected Harry from irreversible death.

While Voldemort did learn of Harry's telepathic connection, Voldemort was never aware that Harry was inadvertently carrying a fragment of his soul. With this destroyed, the connections between the two were also broken, and Harry never again felt pain in his scar. Rowling revealed Harry has also lost the ability to speak Parseltongue, though he regained the ability to understand it in Harry Potter and the Cursed Child after his scar began to hurt again following the rise of Voldemort and Bellatrix's daughter Delphi whom Harry, his son Albus, and his allies defeated and sent to Azkaban. In the epilogue of the last film, the scar has faded to an ordinary-looking scar on Harry's forehead.

Nagini

The sixth Horcrux was Nagini, the snake Voldemort had with him constantly. This Horcrux was created by Voldemort when he was hiding in the forests of Albania; the murder victim whom he used for its creation was Bertha Jorkins. He found Nagini, and becoming smitten by the snake, turned it into a Horcrux, being connected with it. In the last chapter of Deathly Hallows, Nagini was killed by Neville Longbottom using the sword of Godric Gryffindor. The destruction of the last remaining Horcrux made Voldemort mortal.

Legendary magical artifacts

Goblet of Fire

The Goblet of Fire is a goblet made of wood and is used at the beginning of every Triwizard Tournament. It is used solely to choose the participating school champions, serving as an "impartial judge." Slips of parchment with the names of potential candidates are placed in the Goblet and, at the designated time, a representative from each school is chosen when the slip of parchment containing their name spouts forth from the Goblet in a fountain of magical fire. Barty Crouch Jr., masquerading as Professor Moody, stated that the Goblet of Fire was "an exceptionally powerful magical object" and it is very difficult to hoodwink, unless someone uses an exceptionally strong Confundus Charm.

During its use in Goblet of Fire, it is placed in the entrance hall and surrounded by an "Age Line", a charm placed by Dumbledore to prevent underage wizards from entering the tournament. Anyone underage would grow a long white beard, as the Weasley twins demonstrated when they attempted to fool the goblet with an Ageing Potion. When not in use, the Goblet is kept in a jewelled casket in Dumbledore's closet.

Godric Gryffindor's Sword

The Sword of Godric Gryffindor is a goblin-made sword adorned with large rubies on the pommel. It was once owned by Godric Gryffindor, one of the medieval founders of Hogwarts. In Chamber of Secrets, Harry draws the Sword out of the Sorting Hat to battle and kill Salazar Slytherin's basilisk. When Dumbledore learns of Harry's concern that he does not belong in the House of Gryffindor, in part at being parseltongue like Lord Voldemort, the headmaster is able to put the boy's concerns at ease by telling him only a true member of that house could have summoned that sword in his time of need. The sword also plays a key role in Deathly Hallows, where it is revealed to have become imbued with Basilisk venom following its use against the Basilisk, as it "only takes in that which makes it stronger". It is subsequently used to destroy three of Voldemort's Horcruxes.

Because the Sword was goblin-forged, it is indestructible. According to Griphook the goblin, the Sword was originally forged by the goblin Ragnuk the First and "stolen" by Gryffindor. The Sword was taken by Griphook when the Sword fell from Harry's grasp during the raid on Bellatrix Lestrange's vault in book seven. The sword returned to wizard hands when Neville pulled it out of the Sorting Hat and used it to decapitate Nagini, Voldemort's snake. This shows that no matter where the sword happened to be at the time, it will reappear in the Hat when a true member of Gryffindor house is in need of it.

Rowling has confirmed  that Gryffindor did not steal the sword from Ragnuk and that this belief is merely part of Griphook's goblin mistrust and prejudice against wizards.  Godric Gryffindor commissioned Ragnuk the First to make the sword for him under his specifications. Once Ragnuk had made the sword, he was so fond of it that after he had presented it to Gryffindor, he told the goblins it had been stolen and sent minions to retrieve it for him. Gryffindor defeated the goblins using magic and instead of killing them, he bewitched them to go back to Ragnuk and say that if he tried to take the sword again, he would use it against them. The king took the threat seriously, but still insisted it had been stolen from him until the day he died.

It is mentioned in the Deathly Hallows that the Sword of Gryffindor is supposed to be in Bellatrix Lestrange's vault, placed there by Severus Snape. Unknown to Bellatrix, that sword was only a replica. When Harry, Ron and Hermione were captured and brought to Malfoy Manor, she spotted the sword near one of the Snatchers, who intended to keep it. She killed him and forced the rest out of the room, then tortured Hermione for information about the sword. But at Harry's request, Griphook lied and said that the sword was a forgery. Bellatrix's reaction to having her vault possibly broken into convinced Harry that the Horcrux was also placed in her vault.

Philosopher's stone

Based upon the ancient alchemical idea of the philosopher's stone, the stone is owned by Nicolas Flamel and first mentioned in Harry Potter and the Philosopher's Stone. The stone is legendary in that it changes all metals to gold, and can be used to brew a potion called the Elixir of Life, making the drinker immortal. The Philosopher's Stone is seen only in the first and last book, although it is referenced several times throughout the series. It was destroyed at the end of the first book by Dumbledore with Flamel's agreement.

In the American version, this stone is called the sorcerer's stone.

Sorting Hat

The Sorting Hat is a sapient artefact used at Hogwarts, which uses legilimency (essentially, the ability to read minds) to determine which of the four school houses – Gryffindor, Hufflepuff, Ravenclaw or Slytherin – each new student is to be assigned for their years at Hogwarts. The hat resembles a dilapidated conical leather wide-brimmed wizard's hat, with folds and tears that make it appear to have eyes and a mouth. During the opening banquet at the beginning of each school year, the Hat is placed on every first-year student's head. The Hat announces its choice aloud, and the student joins the selected house. The Hat speaks to the student while they're being sorted and is willing to take the student's preferences into account when it makes its decision. Sometimes it does not have the need to do so: for instance, the Hat barely touched Draco Malfoy's head before sending him to Slytherin. The Sorting Hat had a difficult time placing Harry, almost placing him into Slytherin house before he requested specifically and emphatically not to be. The Hat instead placed him into Gryffindor, the house of his parents.

The Sorting Hat originally belonged to Godric Gryffindor, one of the four founders of Hogwarts. The four founders used to hand-pick the students for their houses, but then realised someone else would have to do it after they died, so Gryffindor took off his hat, enchanted it, and let it choose. Since then, the Sorting Hat has always been used to choose which house the students are put in. Due to its age, it appears "patched and frayed and extremely dirty." Before Sorting the students each year, the hat recites a new introductory song. These songs occasionally warn of danger to come, as in Order of the Phoenix. The Sorting Hat's songs vary in length and content, but always include a brief description of each house.

The Sorting Hat has shown the ability to conjure the Sword of Gryffindor from under its brim, as shown in two instances. Both times it is used to kill snakes; in Chamber of Secrets, it provides the sword to Harry to kill the Basilisk, and in Deathly Hallows, it delivers the sword to Neville. Dumbledore makes it clear in Chamber of Secrets that only a true Gryffindor can summon the sword in this fashion. In Deathly Hallows the Sorting Hat is set on fire by Voldemort, although it appears the hat was not destroyed, as Neville was able to draw the Sword of Gryffindor from it immediately after and behead Voldemort's snake Nagini. In the epilogue at the end of Deathly Hallows, the Hat's survival is confirmed, as Harry tells his youngest son that the Hat would take his preference into consideration.

According to Pottermore, a Hatstall is 'an archaic Hogwarts term for any new student whose Sorting takes longer than five minutes. This is an exceptionally long time for the Sorting Hat to deliberate, and occurs rarely, perhaps once every 50 years. Of Harry Potter's contemporaries, Hermione Granger and Neville Longbottom came closest to being Hatstalls. The Sorting Hat spent nearly four minutes trying to decide whether it should place Hermione in Ravenclaw or Gryffindor. In Neville's case, the Hat was determined to place him in Gryffindor: Neville, intimidated by that house's reputation for bravery, requested a placing in Hufflepuff. Their silent wrangling resulted in triumph for the Hat.'

J. K. Rowling has stated on Pottermore that 'The Sorting Hat is notorious for refusing to admit it has made a mistake in its sorting of a student. On those occasions when Slytherins behave altruistically or selflessly, when Ravenclaws flunk all their exams, when Hufflepuffs prove lazy yet academically gifted and when Gryffindors exhibit cowardice, the Hat steadfastly backs its original decision. On balance, however, the Hat has made remarkably few errors of judgement over the many centuries it has been at work.'

In the Harry Potter films, the Sorting Hat was voiced by actor Leslie Phillips.

Mirrors
The Mirror of Erised

The Mirror of Erised is a mystical mirror discovered by Harry in an abandoned classroom in Philosopher's Stone. On it is inscribed "erised stra ehru oyt ube cafru oyt on wohsi". When mirrored and correctly spaced, this reads "I show not your face but your heart's desire." As "erised" reversed is "desire," it is the "Mirror of Desire." Harry, upon encountering the Mirror, can see his parents, as well as what appears to be a crowd of relatives. The last thing Harry saw in the mirror was Voldemort defeated.

Ron sees himself as Head Boy and Quidditch Captain holding the House Cup, revealing his wish to escape from the shadow of his highly successful older brothers. Dumbledore cautions Harry that the Mirror gives neither knowledge nor truth, merely showing the viewer's deepest desire, and that men have wasted their lives away before it, entranced by what they see.

Dumbledore claims to see himself holding a pair of socks he always wanted, telling Harry that "one can never have enough socks," and lamenting that he did not receive any for Christmas, since people will insist on giving him books. However, Harry suspects that this is not true. J. K Rowling has stated that what he really sees is his entire family alive, well and happy together again, much like Harry.

The Mirror of Erised was the final protection given to the Philosopher's Stone in the first book. Dumbledore hid the Mirror and hid the Stone inside it, knowing that only a person who wanted to find but not use the Stone would be able to obtain it. Anyone else would see themselves making an Elixir of Life or turning things to gold, rather than actually finding the Stone, and would be unable to obtain it. What happens to the mirror afterwards is unknown.

Two-way mirrors
In Order of the Phoenix, Sirius gives Harry a mirror he originally used to communicate with James while they were in separate detentions. That mirror is a part of a set of Two-way Mirrors that are activated by holding one of them and saying the name of the other possessor, causing his or her face to appear on the caller's mirror and vice versa. Harry receives this mirror from Sirius in a package after spending his Christmas holiday at Grimmauld Place. Harry, at first, chooses not to open the package, although he does discover the mirror after Sirius' death, by which point it is no longer functional. It makes its second appearance in Deathly Hallows when Mundungus Fletcher loots Grimmauld Place and sells Sirius' mirror to Aberforth Dumbledore, who uses it to watch out for Harry in Deathly Hallows. When Harry desperately cries for help to a shard of the magical mirror (which broke in the bottom of his trunk), a brilliant blue eye belonging to Aberforth (which Harry mistakes for Albus' eye), appears and he sends Dobby, who arrives to help Harry escape from Malfoy Manor to Shell Cottage.

Prank objects
Weasleys' Wizard Wheezes

Prank objects from Weasleys' Wizard Wheezes are made and designed by the owners of the shop, Fred and George, who test their new creations on themselves and other Hogwarts students.
 Weasley's Wild-fire Whiz-Bangs are enchanted fireworks that have overly spectacular and remarkable effects. In the books, they are engineered to not generate any amounts of heat, light, or noise that could be harmful. In the film of Order of the Phoenix, however, the fireworks create a large fiery dragon that attacks Umbridge, burning her and leaving her covered in soot.
 Skiving Snackboxes are sweets that are designed to make the eater temporarily ill in order to skip or "skive off" class. Each variety of Snackboxes causes a different effect, such as vomiting, fainting or developing nosebleeds. One end of the sweet causes the malady, while the other end subsequently cures it. The snackboxes include: Nosebleed Nougat, Fever Fudge, Fainting Fancies, Blood Blisterpods and Puking Pastilles.
 Patented Daydream Charms are kits that put the user into a realistic 30-minute daydream which they imagine, and can easily be customised so as to be fitted into any lesson.
 A Headless Hat creates a limited field of invisibility that covers the wearer's head, giving them the appearance of not having a head. Its counterpart is a Shield Hat, which deflects minor hexes and curses. Though Fred and George design the Shield Hat to be a trick item, Ministry officials are impressed by its practical value and order 500 of them for the protection of the Aurors. Shield Cloaks and Shield Gloves are also on sale following the Shield Hat's success.
 Trick Wands are magical fake wands that turn into a silly item (rubber chickens, tin parrots, etc.) when someone tries to use them. More expensive varieties beat the unwary user about the head and neck.
 Ton-Tongue Toffees make the eater's tongue temporarily grow to an alarmingly large size, as read about in Goblet of Fire when Fred "accidentally" drops some in front of Dudley, who subsequently eats one they "forgot" to retrieve.
 Canary Creams make the eater turn briefly into a large canary; when the effect wears off, the person moults and returns to normal.
 U-No-Poo causes the consumer to have constipation, or as Fred and George refer to it: "The constipation sensation that's gripping the nation." Its name is a play on "You-Know-Who", commonly used to refer to Voldemort.
 Extendable Ears are long flesh-coloured strings, one end of which is inserted into a user's ear and the other end placed further away towards a conversation or sound. Much like a listening device, the user will be able to hear the sounds as if they were much closer to the source. They were first introduced by Fred and George Weasley in Harry Potter and the Order of the Phoenix, when they used the ears to listen to the Order's meetings, until one was destroyed (and eaten) by Crookshanks.
 Portable Swamps are, as the name suggests, realistic pop-up swamps. They were first seen in Order of the Phoenix after Umbridge is named Headmistress. Fred and George set one off in a corridor, partly as a distraction for Umbridge so Harry can use her fireplace, and partly to just cause general mayhem. They seem to be reasonably difficult to remove: Umbridge cannot remove it and forces Filch to punt students across, while Professor Flitwick vanishes it almost instantly later on in the novel. (He leaves a small patch untouched as a tribute to Fred and George, who have left Hogwarts by this point.)
 Decoy Detonators are described as black horn type objects that will run out of sight, and make a noise giving the user a good distraction. Introduced in Harry Potter and the Half-Blood Prince. First used by Harry while breaking into Dolores Umbridge's office at the Ministry of Magic in Harry Potter and the Deathly Hallows.
Guaranteed Ten-Second Pimple Vanisher
Pygmy Puffs (miniature Puffskeins)
Edible Dark Marks

There are also prank items which the Weasleys import from elsewhere, such as:

Peruvian Instant Darkness Powder, which throws an area into darkness that cannot be penetrated by wand light or any magical means, although the effect wears off in a few minutes. Draco Malfoy uses it to avoid members of Dumbledore's Army in Half-Blood Prince. It is also used in the Half-Blood Prince film by Harry in order to gain access to the luggage space above Draco Malfoy's table on the Hogwarts Express.

Zonko's Joke Shop
Zonko's Joke Shop was a favorite place for Hogwarts students to shop on Hogsmeade trips. It carried "jokes and tricks to fulfil even Fred and George's wildest dreams." Such products include Hiccough Sweets, Frog Spawn Soap, and Nose-Biting Teacups. Fred and George tried to buy the place to expand their shop in Hogsmeade during Harry's sixth year, but they turned it down due to the dark times coming up.

Other prank objects
Other prank objects include Belch Powder, Dungbombs (which explode and cause a large and extremely smelly mess), and Ever-Bashing Boomerangs (which hit their target repeatedly after being thrown). Fanged Frisbees are quite literally normal Frisbees with fangs and are first mentioned in Goblet of Fire as one of Filch's newest restricted items during Dumbledore's start-of-term speech. However, they make their first appearance in Half-Blood Prince when Ron whirled one around the Gryffindor common room, it changed course with a mind of its own, and took a bite out of a tapestry. Most of these objects are banned at Hogwarts due to the possibility of injury.

More objects include Screaming Yo-Yos, which scream very loudly when worked, and Stink Pellets, which are used to distract prefects and teachers, and give a most unpleasant smell.

Storage receptacles
Hermione's handbag
In Harry Potter and the Deathly Hallows, Hermione used an Undetectable Extension Charm on her beaded handbag, significantly enlarging the bag's internal dimensions without affecting its physical size. As well, the mass of the objects placed in her handbag is negated, making the bag easy to carry. Bags similar to this appear in other contexts, such as the "bag of holding" in Dungeons and Dragons or the "magic satchel" in many other games, and Felix the Cat's "bag of tricks." Mary Poppins also seems to have a handbag of similar uses. Hermione uses it to carry everything they need when they travel across the United Kingdom on their hunt for Horcruxes.

Mokeskin pouch
Mokeskin pouches are a type of draw-string pouch that can be operated only by the owner. Harry receives one as his 17th birthday present from Hagrid, using it to store several items of personal significance, such as the Golden Snitch, his broken wand, the false locket, the shard of Sirius' mirror and the Marauders' Map.

Moody's Magical Trunk

Alastor Moody owns a strangely bewitched magical trunk. It has seven locks on it, and the trunk opens to a different assortment of objects for each lock. Other compartments contain spellbooks, Dark Detectors, and Moody's invisibility cloak.

Pensieve
 
A Pensieve is a stone basin used to review memories. Covered in mystic runes, it contains memories whose physical form is neither gas nor liquid. A witch or wizard can extract their own or another's memories, store them in the Pensieve, and review them later. It also relieves the mind when it becomes cluttered with information. Anyone can examine the memories in the Pensieve, which also allows viewers to fully immerse themselves in the memories stored within, much like a magical form of virtual reality.

Users of these devices view the memories from a third-person-point-of-view, providing a near-omniscient perspective of the events preserved. J. K. Rowling confirmed memories in the Pensieve allow one to view details of things that happened even if they did not notice or remember them, and stated "that's the magic of the Pensieve, what brings it alive." The memories contained in the Pensieve have the appearance of silver threads. Memories that have deteriorated due to age, or that were heavily manipulated or tampered with to alter perspectives (such as Slughorn's), may appear thick and jelly-like and offer obscured viewing. Memories are not limited to just those of humans, since Hokey the house-elf provided Dumbledore with a memory as well. It makes its last appearance in Deathly Hallows when Harry uses it to uncover the truth about Snape.

In the fourth film, the Pensieve in Dumbledore's office conforms to the description given in the novel. However, in the sixth and eighth films, it appears as a shallow metal dish, floating in midair and filled with a mercury-like liquid. During the eighth film, Harry removes it from the stone basin so he can use it to examine Snape's memories.

Transportation
Arthur Weasley's Flying Ford Anglia

Arthur Weasley owned a 1960 Ford Anglia 105E that he subsequently enchanted; consequently, the vehicle can fly, become invisible, and carry the entire Weasley family in spite of its formerly non-enchanted interior dimensions (also the Undetectable Extension Charm), among other abilities. The enchantment placed on the car also made it semi-sentient. In Harry Potter and the Chamber of Secrets, the car is borrowed by Fred, George and Ron, who use it to rescue Harry from the Dursleys' house. Ron and Harry later steal the car in order to return to Hogwarts after the gate to Platform 9¾ is sealed by Dobby. After they arrive at school, landing in the Whomping Willow, the car ejects Harry, Ron, and their luggage, then flees into the Forbidden Forest, ignoring Ron's pleas for it to come back. Mr Weasley soon faces an inquiry at the Ministry of Magic, as seven Muggles saw the car flying across areas of Central London and the British countryside, and is forced to pay a large fine.

The car reappears when Harry, Ron, and Fang visit Aragog in the forest: when the great spider's colony of acromantula attempt to devour the three, the car attacks the spiders and carries them to safety; it allowed Ron to control its functions during the escape. The car does not return to the Weasleys despite saving Ron, Harry, and Fang from Aragog's children, instead reentering the forest to remain on its own. The car's current condition is undisclosed; Ron had commented that the enchanted vehicle had become "wild" and thus operated autonomously, like a wild animal. According to Ron, the car does not require fuel and can keep going until it is destroyed. Canonically, it is still roaming around the Forbidden Forest, waiting for a Weasley to have need of it again.

The 1962 Ford Anglia used in the film was acquired by Rupert Grint, who plays Ron Weasley, and is currently displayed in the National Motor Museum, Beaulieu. A total of 14 Ford Anglias were destroyed during the filming of the scene where the car crashes into the Whomping Willow.

A replica of the car in its feral state could be seen in the queue line for the now-defunct Dragon Challenge roller coaster at the Universal Studios Islands of Adventure theme park. Occasionally it blinked its headlights and honked its horn when its motion detectors sensed that guests were standing in front of it or walking by it. The replica has been integrated into Hagrid's Magical Creatures Motorbike Adventure and can be seen sitting atop a large rock formation with its windshield wipers and headlights running while under the control of Cornish Pixies. It can also be heard blaring its horn as riders pass beneath the arch. The car appears in the Hogwarts Express attraction where it can be seen flying alongside the train before crashing in the Forbidden Forest.

Broomsticks

Broomsticks are used for transportation by witches and wizards of all ages, and for participating in the game of Quidditch. Their use is similar to that of flying carpets, although the latter are banned in Great Britain by the Ministry of Magic. However, they are uncomfortable for extended trips, even with a cushion charm applied, and thus many wizards favour other means of transport for those journeys.

Broomsticks are treated as a major consumer product in the wizarding world. There are numerous manufacturers and models of brooms, including Cleansweeps and Comets, all of which vary in their capabilities. These range from expensive high-performance models to toy broomsticks for young children that fly only a few feet off the ground to family-sized broomsticks that seat multiple people and include a luggage compartment below the seating area.

Since Harry plays Quidditch, his broomsticks - a Nimbus 2000 and later a Firebolt - are prominent in the series. The Nimbus 2000 was given to him by special consent of Dumbledore via Minerva McGonagall, who had chosen him as the Gryffindor Seeker. The Firebolt was given to him by his godfather Sirius Black as a Christmas gift after his Nimbus was destroyed by the Whomping Willow tree during a Quidditch match. The Firebolt remains the fastest broom in the world, having surpassed the previous record holder, the Nimbus 2001 (which Draco Malfoy owns and which his father Lucius Malfoy had given as gifts to the entire Slytherin team as a bribe to have Draco as their Seeker). The price of the Firebolt is so high it is only available upon request.

Floo Powder

Floo Powder is a glittering powder used by wizards to travel and communicate using fireplaces. It was invented by Ignatia Wildsmith (1227–1320) and named after the flue, which is the passageway that leads from a fireplace to the chimney and allows hot gases to escape.

Floo powder can be used with any fireplace connected to the Floo Network. To transport from one to another, the fire at the point of departure must first be lit. The traveler throws a handful of Floo powder into the flames, turning them emerald green, then steps into the fireplace and states the intended destination in a clear and purposeful voice. Floo powder can also be used for communication; a wizard or witch can kneel in front of the fireplace and stick their head into the fire, which will then appear in the fire of the destination fireplace, leaving the witch or wizard free to talk. It is also known that other body parts may be transported via Floo Powder, as Umbridge almost catches Sirius the second time he converses with Harry through the Floo network. Voices can also be transmitted through the Floo Network, as seen in the Prisoner of Azkaban by Snape, who summons Lupin through his office's fireplace while interrogating Harry about the Marauder's Map.

In Chamber of Secrets, the Weasleys travel to Diagon Alley using Floo Powder. Harry did not say "Diagon Alley" clearly enough due to coughing in the fire's smoke and ashes, so he was sent to Borgin and Burkes in Knockturn Alley. In the fourth book, Mr. Weasley uses his position at the Ministry to have the Dursleys' fireplace temporarily connected to the Floo Network, unaware that it had been blocked up. Sirius uses the network to communicate with Harry in the same book. In the fifth book, Harry uses the Gryffindor fireplace and later Umbridge's fireplace to communicate with Sirius; he is forced to use the latter because Umbridge begins monitoring all other lines of communication in and out of Hogwarts.

The Floo Network is controlled by the Ministry of Magic. The Ministry also has over 700 fireplaces in its headquarters so that officials and workers can go directly to/from work without the hustle and bustle of travelling on brooms or by Portkey - or the indignity of having to flush themselves in through a public toilet, as portrayed in Deathly Hallows.

According to Pottermore, the only licensed producer of Floo Powder in Britain is Floo-Pow, a company whose Headquarters is located in Diagon Alley. No shortage of Floo Powder has ever been reported, nor does anybody know anyone who makes it. Its price has remained constant for one hundred years: two Sickles a scoop.

Flying carpets
Flying carpets are rugs, that are enchanted with the ability to fly. Flying Carpets were once an accepted form of travel for the British magical community, but they are banned due to being defined as a Muggle Artefact by the Registry of Proscribed Charmable Objects. It is therefore against British wizarding law to charm carpets or fly them, although they are still legal in other countries. Mr. Weasley was heavily involved in the introduction of this legislation due to his position in the Misuse of Muggle Artefacts office. It is revealed that the ban was relatively recent, not only due to Mr. Weasley's involvement, but also because Barty Crouch's grandfather owned and operated a 12-seater Axminster before flying carpets were prohibited.

Hogwarts Express

The Hogwarts Express is the train which transports Hogwarts students to and from the school at the beginning and end of each term. It also transports willing students home for the Christmas holidays. It is stationed in Hogsmeade when not in use, and it can be accessed only by using the magical wall between platforms 9 and 10 of King's Cross train station (known as " Platform 9¾") in London.

Knight Bus

The Knight Bus is a heavily enchanted purple triple-decker Regent III class bus that transports witches and wizards. Anyone wishing to use the bus may hail it by holding out their wand hand, regardless of where they are or the time of day. It makes its first appearance in Prisoner of Azkaban when Harry unintentionally hails it by throwing out his wand arm to break his fall after a stumble. Harry has a final ride on the Knight Bus with a number of his friends in Order of the Phoenix. The Knight Bus is faster than travelling by broomstick, but not as fast as near-instantaneous Floo Powder and apparating. The bus charges for the service based on distance; Harry is charged a base fare of 11 Sickles to travel from Little Whinging to The Leaky Cauldron. Amenities such as hot-water bottles, toothbrushes, and hot chocolate are available for a small additional fee.

The bus functions as a convenient form of public transportation for wizards and witches who either prefer to use it or are unable to travel by other means. The riders are seemingly picked up by the bus from all over in-universe Great Britain, bringing passengers to the destinations of their choice with seemingly no set route. It bolts through the streets entirely invisible to Muggles and causes other objects to dodge it (instead of the other way around) for short distance-travel. For longer distances, the Knight Bus instantly leaps 100 miles (160 km) at a time, accompanied by a great bang and jolt. The interior of the bus changes depending on the time of day, having seats by day and beds by night. It is also highly uncomfortable, according to Ron and Harry. Its only mentioned limitation in travelling is that it is unable to voyage through water.

The conductor of the Knight Bus is Stan Shunpike, and its driver is Ernie Prang. In the third film, Ernie is accompanied by a talking shrunken head voiced by Lenny Henry.

As revealed on Pottermore, the Knight Bus was first commissioned in 1865 as a method for underage or infirm wizards to transport themselves discreetly. The idea was proposed by then-Minister of Magic Dugald McPhail, after a number of other ideas such as broomsticks with sidecars were vetoed, taking inspiration from the then-relatively-new bus service.

The actual Knight Bus seen in the film adaptation was built by grafting the top deck of a London AEC Regent III RT bus onto the top of another "RT" bus. Both buses were originally built for London Transport; the "RT" was the standard London diesel-powered double-decker bus of which approximately 4,000 were built from 1939 until the mid-1950s (and were used in daily service until 1979). The actual bus used was RT3882 (registration LLU681), with the additional top deck from former RT2240 (registration KGU169). Parts of RT 4497 (OLD 717) were also used. A replica of the Knight Bus sits in front of the London facade at The Wizarding World of Harry Potter in Universal Studios Florida, serving as a stage for a small audience-interactive show with a Stan Shunpike look-alike and a shrunken head.

Portkeys
Portkeys are first introduced in Goblet of Fire by Arthur Weasley. They are an alternative to apparation but can also be used to transport a group of people at once. Created by using the Portus spell, a Portkey can be set to transport anybody who touches it to a designated location or to become active at a predetermined time and transport itself and anyone touching it to its set destination. It may be created for one-way, one-time use or to transport the holder to and from a particular place in a round trip; in addition, it may be set to activate at a particular time or automatically transport the first person who touches it. The creation of Portkeys is highly restricted and controlled by the Ministry through the Department of Magical Transport's Portkey office. Cornelius Fudge objects to Dumbledore spontaneously creating one, stating that Dumbledore hasn't got authorisation; and at one point in chapter 3, Lupin says, "... it's more than our life's worth to set up an unauthorised Portkey."

Any object can be used as a Portkey. As a safety measure to discourage unsuspecting Muggles from picking them up and activating them, wizards are advised to use old, worthless items. Portkey objects used in the Potter series include a football and an old Wellington [boot]. Once the Portus charm is cast upon an object, it glows blue and vibrates gently; once settled it has become a Portkey. When Portkeys are activated, users feel the sensation of a hook being jerked from behind their navel. The floor disappears from beneath their feet, leaving their last position behind them, and they fly forward through a whirlwind of colour and sound, appearing suddenly at their destination. With enough practice it is possible to achieve a graceful landing: After the Portkey trip to the Quidditch World Cup in the fourth film, Mr. Weasley, Cedric and Amos Diggory land on their feet, while the less experienced teenagers, including Harry, fall on the ground.

A Portkey plays an important role later in the climax of Harry Potter and the Goblet of Fire. At the end of the Triwizard Tournament, the Triwizard Cup is revealed to have been turned into a Portkey by Barty Crouch Jr. to transport Harry and Cedric to a graveyard, where Cedric is killed and Voldemort regains physical form. Prompted by his parents, Harry later uses the Portkey to escape with Cedric's body back to Hogwarts.

Sirius Black's Enchanted Motorbike

Sirius Black owned a flying motorbike, which he lent to Hagrid the night Harry's parents died. It is first seen when Hagrid delivers the baby Harry to Number 4, Privet Drive in the first book, and then again when Hagrid uses it to transport Harry to a safe house in the seventh volume. In Deathly Hallows, various modifications have been made to the bike by Mr. Weasley, allowing it to create a brick wall or a net that erupts from the exhaust pipe and to shoot dragon fire from the exhaust, impelling the bike's sudden acceleration. The dragon-fire feature is used to great effect by Hagrid and Harry when being chased by Voldemort; however, Mr. Weasley did warn that he was unsure of its safety and that they should use it only in an emergency. He was right to say this, as the sidecar of the motorbike, unaffected by Hagrid's magic, dislodged after the abrupt acceleration.

The bike is severely damaged when, with Hagrid and Harry aboard, it crashes into Ted and Andromeda Tonks' garden pond. Mr. Weasley covertly tells Harry that he plans to put the bike back together when "he has time", meaning when Mrs. Weasley is distracted or has forgotten about it. He hides it in the chicken coop and manages to repair it, giving it to Harry between the end of Deathly Hallows and the epilogue. The bike is now still in Harry's possession, but he doesn't use it.

Time-Turner

A Time-Turner may be used for short-term time travel. Hermione receives a Time-Turner from McGonagall in Prisoner of Azkaban, enabling her to attend more than one class simultaneously. Hermione is ordered to keep it a secret from everyone, including Harry and Ron, although they notice the suspicious impossibility of her schedule and several bizarre disappearances and reappearances. Hermione reveals the secret to Harry and Ron near the end of the book, when she and Harry use the Time-Turner to save Sirius Black and Buckbeak. Strained by her heavy course load, she returns the device to McGonagall at the end of the novel. In the film version, however, only McGonagall, Dumbledore and Harry know that Hermione possesses the time-turner, as Ron witnesses Harry and Hermione travelling back in time in the infirmary, but sees them returning moments later near the end of the film.

A large supply of Time-Turners is kept at the Ministry, as seen in Order of the Phoenix; however, during the events of that book, a glass-fronted cabinet containing the Time-Turners is destroyed. Due to their time-affecting properties, the cabinet is seen to fall, shatter and repair itself repeatedly. In Half-Blood Prince, Hermione quotes an article in The Daily Prophet which stated that "the entire stock of Ministry Time-Turners" was destroyed during that incident. The books do not discuss who else may be in possession of Time-Turners outside of the Ministry. Time-Turners are dangerous when in the wrong hands, as it is said that many wizards met their demise after confronting and accidentally killing their own selves from the future, so they are issued very carefully.

Hermione's Time-Turner resembles a gold hourglass pendant on a necklace; it is unclear if all do. The user twists the hourglass pendant, with the number of twists corresponding to the number of hours of back travel required.

Time-Turners are a significant point device in Cursed Child, where it is revealed that a principle known as Croaker's Law restricts all legal Time-Turners to travelling a maximum of five hours into the past (any longer would create ripple effects that would harm either the time traveller or time itself) – although it is widely rumoured that Draco Malfoy's son Scorpius is the son of Lord Voldemort and that Scorpius' mother used a Time-Turner to make this possible. An illegal Time-Turner capable of travelling back years is confiscated from a Dark wizard by the Ministry of Magic (although official word remains that all Time-Turners are destroyed) and is later stolen by Albus Potter and Scorpius Malfoy, who intend to travel back in time to prevent the death of Cedric Diggory. Unfortunately, they quickly discover the Time-Turner is a cheaply made prototype that only takes them back for five minutes before forcibly returning them to the present. After accidentally creating (and then undoing) an alternate reality where Voldemort survived and took over the world, Albus and Scorpius resolve to destroy the Time-Turner, but are forced into another time trip by the story's villain and are left trapped in the past when the Time-Turner is destroyed. Back in the present, Draco reveals he possesses a professionally made Time-Turner (bound by neither Croaker's Law nor the five-minute flaw) - he never admitted its existence for fear it would lend credence to the rumours surrounding his son and never used it (despite being tempted by the possibility of seeing his dead wife alive again). When Albus and Scorpius are able to send a message to their parents, Draco's Time-Turner is used to rescue the boys.

Vanishing Cabinet
The Vanishing Cabinet is a cabinet located in the Room of Requirement at Hogwarts. It is one of a pair. The other cabinet resides in Borgin & Burkes. If used properly, a person who steps into one of the cabinets will instantly emerge from the other.

The Vanishing Cabinet is first seen in Chamber of Secrets when Harry hides in it to elude the Malfoys after accidentally travelling to Borgin & Burkes via the Floo Network; its transportation features are not activated as he does not shut the Cabinet completely. Its Hogwarts counterpart is also mentioned in Chamber of Secrets when Nearly Headless Nick persuades Peeves the Poltergeist to drop it (thus breaking it) over Filch's office in order to help Harry escape detention for tracking in mud. It was also used in Order of the Phoenix by Fred and George when they forced Montague, the Slytherin Quidditch captain and a member of Dolores Umbridges' Inquisitorial Squad, into it when he tried to take house points from Gryffindor. Draco then learns of Montague's experience, discovering transportation is possible between the two Cabinets and the other is located in Borgin & Burkes. In Half-Blood Prince he manages to repair the broken one at Hogwarts so as to transport the Death Eaters into the highly secured castle.

Though this set is the only one mentioned in the book series, the film version of Half-Blood Prince reveals that they were popular when Voldemort first came to power, as they would allow people to make a quick getaway from Voldemort and his Death Eaters in an emergency.

Writing equipment
Anti-Cheating Quill
The Anti-Cheating Quill, a quill with an anti-cheating charm on it, is first mentioned in Philosopher's Stone. In book five they are assigned to every O.W.L. student – and presumably those taking other exams – in order to prevent students from cheating in their written exams.

Auto-Answer Quill
The Auto-Answer Quill is a quill that has been bewitched so that when the quill touches a question on a piece of parchment it writes the answer instantly. The quill is banned from the O.W.L. Examinations and the inks are checked out every time the test is on.

Blood Quill
The Blood Quill is a torture quill used by Umbridge throughout the Order of the Phoenix to punish students whom she has given detention. It is described as having an unusually sharp black nib. As the user writes, the quill magically and very painfully cuts into the back of the user's hand and uses his or her blood for ink. In the fifth book, Harry has detention with Umbridge on several occasions; he is required to write lines (I must not tell lies) and is not released from this until Umbridge believes "the message has sunk in." When carried out repeatedly over an extended period, this leads to permanent scarring, as Harry shows Scrimgeour in the last two books. The scars tingle whenever Harry hears Umbridge's name, but it is not clear whether this is psychological or akin to Harry's forehead scar hurting whenever Voldemort is active. Another victim of this form of detention is Lee Jordan; in the film adaptation of the book, members of Dumbledore's Army are forced to use these quills as well. Blood quills are considered illegal to own.

The Quill of Acceptance
According to Pottermore, the Quill of Acceptance is a magical object which detects the birth of a child with magical capabilities. It is located in Hogwarts School, where it records the children's names in a large book. Professor McGonagall consults the book and sends out the subsequent Hogwarts acceptance letters by owl once the child turns eleven. It has been made very popular due to its use in registering users for the closed beta of Pottermore.

Quick Quotes Quill
A Quick Quotes Quill is a stenographic tool, acid green in colour, employed by Rita Skeeter to spin the words of her subjects into a more salacious or melodramatic form. In Harry Potter and the Goblet of Fire, Skeeter uses the quill to interview Harry about his participation in the Triwizard Tournament for her column in The Daily Prophet. Harry continually tries to alert her to the inaccuracy of the quill; however, she continually ignores him. Additionally, in Deathly Hallows, Rita mentions in her Daily Prophet interview concerning her posthumous biography of Dumbledore that her Quick Quotes Quill helped her to write the book so quickly after his death.

Spell-Checking Quill
The Spell-Checking Quill temporarily corrects spelling as the user writes; however, once the charm wears off it constantly misspells words, even if the user writes them correctly. The most notable example is its misspelling of Ron's name as "Roonil Wazlib" in Half-Blood Prince. It is sold through Weasley's Wizard Wheezes, the joke shop opened by Fred and George Weasley.

Other uncategorised objects
These objects remain uncategorised as they are the only ones in their field.

Cauldron

Cauldrons are magical receptacles in which potions are brewed. They can be bought at the Cauldron Shop in Diagon Alley. There are many different sizes and materials for cauldrons; Hogwarts asks students to buy a simple pewter size 2 cauldron, though in the first book Harry expresses a longing for one of pure gold.

In Goblet of Fire, Percy Weasley writes a report on cauldrons for his new Ministry job in the hope that it will push regulation of the thickness of cauldron bottoms, as he believes foreign imports are a safety risk.

Gubraithian fire
Gubraithian Fire is an everlasting magical fire that may only be created by extremely skilled wizards. Hagrid and Madame Maxime gave a bundle of Gubraithian fire, conjured by Dumbledore, as a gift to the Gurg (leader) of the giants during their attempts to sway them to Dumbledore's side (Death Eaters were trying to get them on their side).

Omnioculars
Omnioculars are a pair of magical brass binoculars used by Harry, Ron and Hermione in the fourth book during the Quidditch World Cup. Omnioculars, besides having the magnification capabilities of binoculars, have many other useful features. For example, they have the ability to slow down or replay something seen through the lenses, although a side effect is that the view in the lenses is not current and can lead to confusion as to the state of the match. They also have a play-by-play feature, where the names of moves performed by Quidditch players are shown in bright purple letters across the Omnioculars' lenses. Omnioculars also have the ability to list the names and numbers of the players, and can zero in on players rapidly.

Spellotape
Spellotape is magical adhesive tape. The name is a play on Sellotape, a popular brand which has become a generic name for transparent adhesive tape in the United Kingdom. It is used by Ron in Chamber of Secrets to repair his wand after he breaks it while trying to halt Mr. Weasley's flying car. It is also used by Hermione in Prisoner of Azkaban when she binds her Care of Magical Creatures (the Monster Book of Monsters) textbook to prevent it from biting her, and by Kreacher to mend a photo of Bellatrix Lestrange later in the series. It is used by Ginny in Goblet of Fire, who was mending her copy of the One Thousand Magical Herbs and Fungi textbook.

Wand

A wand is a wooden stick-like object used to channel magical energy and thus increase its power, and without which only limited magic is possible. Wands are used as both tools and weapons in the wizarding world. They are thus an important aspect of nearly all magic, and great importance is placed on wand mastery. Wands are generally carried inside the wizard's robes or otherwise somewhere on their person; however, they can also be placed into other objects. For instance, Rubeus Hagrid hid the broken halves of his wand inside his umbrella, and in the film adaptations, Lucius Malfoy hides his wand in his cane. In the magical world, when a wizard is expelled from Hogwarts, their wands are snapped in half. This type of damage to a wand is nearly irreparable, though Harry is able to mend his wand, which was accidentally broken by Hermione, with the help of the powerful Elder Wand.

A wand is made by a wandmaker who is learned in wandlore, the study of wands. Wands are handcrafted from high-quality woods, or "wandwoods", which are capable of sustaining magic (e.g. holly, yew, ebony, vinewood, mahogany, cherry, oak, etc.). A core is then inserted into the middle of the wand from top to bottom, which gives it its power to generate magical effects. Common cores include phoenix tail feathers, unicorn tail hairs, and dragon heartstrings. Veela hair is also used, but less commonly. In the Deathly Hallows, the Elder Wand is described as the only wand with a core made from the tail hair of a Thestral. The only wand shop seen in the books is Ollivanders. Garrick Ollivander is a wandmaker who has an eidetic memory concerning wands, as well as the ability to identify the distinguishing features of a wand. In Harry Potter and the Goblet of Fire, Ollivander is seen to evaluate two foreign wands: Viktor Krum's, whose wand was crafted by Gregorovitch, was unusually thick and had a dragon's heartstring core; Fleur Delacour's, created by an unknown wandmaker, was made of rosewood with a core of Veela hair. Ollivander believes Veela hair produces "temperamental" wands and does not use it.

Salazar Slytherin's wand contained a fragment of a basilisk horn, which allowed Slytherin and other Parselmouths who possessed it to cast spells with it at a distance by speaking to it in Parseltongue. In the United States, wand cores are created from the horn of river serpents, Wampus hair, Snallygaster heartstring, and Jackalope antlers, a practice originated in the 17th century by the first American wandmaker, Isolt Sayre, an Irish immigrant who founded the Ilvermorny School of Witchcraft and Wizardry in Massachusetts, and the Slytherin wand's last owner. She buried it outside the school grounds, and within a year, an unknown species of snakewood tree grew from the burial spot. It resisted all attempts to prune or kill it, but after several years the leaves were found to contain powerful medicinal properties.

A wand is generally considered a very personal object. Wands belonging to other wizards can be borrowed, resulting in a comparatively less potent effect. In Philosopher's Stone, Harry had to try out many wands before he found one that "chose him." Wands with cores from the same source give strange effects (Priori Incantatem) when forced to fight each other, as is the case with Harry and Voldemort's wands. In Goblet of Fire, it is revealed each of their wands contains a tail feather from Fawkes, the phoenix belonging to Dumbledore. After Priori Incantatem, the wands get to know the opposites' master, as explained in Deathly Hallows. While, according to Ollivander, any object can channel magic if the wizard is strong enough, wands are the most commonly used because of their efficiency (due to the owner's bond with the wand itself). This can explain how some wizards are able to use spells without wands (for example, retrieving an item with Accio'').

Furthermore, wands are able to be won from a witch or wizard and can therefore change their allegiance. This is the case when Harry takes Draco's wand at Malfoy Manor, and consequently the wand's allegiance swaps to Harry, as explained by Ollivander; and, by extension, so does the allegiance of the Elder Wand, which itself has changed hands many times.

References

Fictional elements introduced in 1997
Objects
Fictional garments
Harry Potter
Harry Potter lists